Valley Farm is a historic mansion and stud farm in Cornersville, Tennessee, U.S..

History
The house was built in 1846 for William Lee McClelland, a farmer. On his death in 1902, it became the home of his daughter Zana McClelland Ogilvie and her husband, Waverley Wilson Ogilvie, who served as the Tennessee Secretary of Agriculture from 1903 to 1905. The Ogilvies bred horses on the farm, and passed it on to their granddaughter, Waverley Murrey Dunning.

Architectural significance
The house was designed in the Greek Revival architectural style. It has been listed on the National Register of Historic places since April 5, 1984.

References

Houses on the National Register of Historic Places in Tennessee
Greek Revival houses in Tennessee
Houses completed in 1820
Buildings and structures in Marshall County, Tennessee
Horse farms in Tennessee